A drafter (also draughtsman / draughtswoman in British and Commonwealth English, draftsman / draftswoman or drafting technician in American and Canadian English) is an engineering technician who makes detailed technical drawings or plans for machinery, buildings, electronics, infrastructure, sections, etc. Drafters use computer software and manual sketches to convert the designs, plans, and layouts of engineers and architects into a set of technical drawings. Drafters operate as the supporting developers and sketch engineering designs and drawings from preliminary design concepts.

Overview 
In the past, drafters sat at drawing boards and used pencils, pens, compasses, protractors, triangles, and other drafting devices to prepare a drawing by hand. From the 1980s through 1990s, board drawings were going out of style as the newly developed computer-aided design (CAD) system was released and was able to produce technical drawings at a faster pace.

Many modern drafters now use computer software such as AutoCAD, Revit, and SolidWorks to flesh out the designs of engineers or architects into technical drawings and blueprints but board drafting still remains the base of the CAD system. Many of these drawings are utilized to create structures, tools or machines. In addition, the drawings also include design specifications like dimensions, materials and procedures. Consequently, drafters may also be casually referred to as CAD operators, engineering draftspersons, or engineering technicians.<ref name="BLC07">Bureau of Labor Statistics (2008) [http://www.bls.gov/oco/ocos111.htm Occupational Outlook Handbook, 2008–09 Edition: Drafters] dated: 18 December 2007. accessed: 24 September 2008.</ref>

With CAD systems, drafters can create and store drawings electronically so that they can be viewed, printed, or programmed directly into automated manufacturing systems. CAD systems also permit drafters to quickly prepare variations of a design. Although drafters use CAD extensively, it is only a tool. Drafters still need knowledge of traditional drafting techniques, in addition to CAD skills. Despite the near global use of CAD systems, manual drafting and sketching are used in certain applications.

Drafters' drawings provide visual guidelines and show how to construct a product or structure. Drawings include technical details and specify dimensions, materials, and procedures. Drafters fill in technical details using drawings, rough sketches, specifications, and calculations made by engineers, surveyors, architects, or scientists. For example, drafters use their knowledge of standardized building techniques to draw in the details of a structure. Some use their understanding of engineering and manufacturing theory and standards to draw the parts of a machine; they determine design elements, such as the numbers and kinds of fasteners needed to assemble the machine. Drafters use technical handbooks, tables, calculators, and computers to complete their work.

 Specialities 
Drafting work has many specialities such as:

 Aeronautical drafters prepare engineering drawings detailing plans and specifications used in the manufacture of aircraft, missiles, and related parts.
 Architectural drafters draw architectural and structural features of buildings and other structures. These designs are used in the construction or remodeling of homes, commercial buildings and power stations. These workers may specialize in a type of structure, such as residential or commercial, or in a kind of building material used, such as reinforced concrete, masonry, steel, or timber.
 Civil drafters prepare drawings and topographical and relief maps used in major construction or civil engineering projects such as buildings, highways, bridges, pipelines, flood-control projects, and water and sewage systems.
 Electrical drafters prepare wiring and layout diagrams used by workers who erect, install, and repair electrical equipment and wiring in communication centers, power plants, electrical distribution systems, and buildings.
 Electronics drafters draw wiring diagrams, circuit board assembly diagrams, schematics, and layout drawings used in the manufacture, installation, and repair of electronic devices and components.
 Mechanical drafters prepare drawings showing the detail and assembly of a wide variety of machinery and mechanical devices, indicating dimensions, fastening methods, manufacturing equipment, and mechanical installation infrastructure.
 Process piping or pipeline drafters prepare drawings used in the layout, construction, and operation of oil and gas fields, refineries, chemical plants, and process piping systems.
 Photovoltaic drafters'' prepare drawings showing inverter Pad location drawings and slab construction drawings, also prepare specific photovoltaic system assembly details and some wiring diagrams.

Employment and work environment 

Drafters work in architectural offices, manufacturing companies, engineering firms, CAD-specific work-groups, construction companies, engineering consultancy firms, the government, natural resource companies or are independently self-employed. Drafting technologists and technicians often work as part of a broader multidisciplinary engineering team in support of engineers, architects or industrial designers or they may work on their own. The position of a drafter is one of a skilled assistant to architects and engineers. Drafters usually work in offices, seated at adjustable drawing boards or drafting tables when doing manual drawings, although modern drafters work at computer terminals much of the time. They usually work in an office environment, but some may have to travel and spend time on manufacturing plants or construction sites. As drafters spend long periods in front of computers doing detailed technical work, they may be susceptible to eyestrain, back discomfort, and hand and wrist problems. Most drafters work standard 40-hour weeks; only a small number work part-time.

Education and training 

High school courses in English, mathematics, science, electronics, computer technology, drafting and design, visual arts, and computer graphics are useful for people considering a drafting career. Attributes required by drafters include technical writing skills, problem-solving skills, the ability to visualize three-dimensional objects from two-dimensional drawings as well as drawing the relationships between parts in machinery and various pieces of infrastructure. Other skills include an in-depth knowledge of the qualities of metals, plastics, wood and other materials used in the overall manufacturing processes and of construction methods and standards. Technical expertise, a strong understanding of construction and the manufacturing process, and a solid knowledge of drafting and design principles are also important assets in becoming a drafter. In the modern job marketplace, in addition to technical skills enabling CAD drafters to draw up plans, soft skills are also crucial as CADD drafters have to communicate with clients and articulate their drawing plans in an effective way with fellow team members in a real-world setting.

Employers prefer applicants who have also completed training after high school at a trade or technical school. Prospective drafters will also need to have a strong background knowledge and experience with CADD software. Though licenses are not a prerequisite for becoming drafters, the American Design Drafting Association (ADDA) does offer certification and licensing. Licensing and certification highlights one's core competence and knowledge of a specific drafting specialty. Drafting and design certificates and diplomas are generally offered by career training schools, trade and technical schools and non-university higher education institutions like community colleges or industrial training institutes.

Apprenticeships combine paid on-the-job training and experience with in-class instruction. People interested in becoming drafters can get qualified as either drafting technologists or drafting technicians. Drafting technologists usually have a 2 to 3-year diploma in engineering design or drafting technology from a community college or technical school. Drafters starting out tend to move from company to company to gain experience and to move up. A more senior drafter often moves up into a management position where they become able to supervise entire projects as they gain more experience or they can start their own business and become self-employed. It is also possible for experienced drafters to enter related fields such as engineering, architecture, industrial design, interior design, exhibit design, landscape design, set design, and animation.

See also 

 Architectural technologist
 Engineering technician
 Steel detailer
 Technical drawing tools
 Leonor Ferrer Girabau

References 

Computer-aided design
Draughtsmen
Technicians
Visual arts occupations